Albert Borgmann (born 1937) is a German-born American philosopher, specializing in the philosophy of technology. He was born in Freiburg, Germany, and is a professor of philosophy at the University of Montana. In 2013 Borgmann received the Golden Eurydice Award for his contributions to philosophy.

Philosophy
Technology and the Character of Contemporary Life (1984) contributed to the emerging philosophical discussions of issues surrounding modern technology. Following a Heideggerian viewpoint, Borgmann introduced the notion of the device paradigm to explain what constitutes technology's essence loosely based on Heidegger's notion of Gestell (enframing). The book explores the limitations of conventional ways of thinking about technology and its social context, both liberal democratic ideals and Marxist lines of thought.

Crossing the Postmodern Divide (1992) is a techno-religious book characterized in terms of hyperreality and hyperactivity. Hyperactivity is usually described as a pathological syndrome of the child and workaholic, and associated with the familiar symptoms of stress and overwork. Borgmann extends the concept of hyperactivity to society as a whole, and defines it as "a state of mobilization where the richness and variety of social and cultural pursuits, and the natural pace of daily life, have been suspended to serve a higher, urgent cause" (p. 14). Christopher Lasch sees this as a kind of militarization of society – "the suspension of civility, the rule of the vanguard, and the subordination of civilians." Meanwhile, critics such as Douglas Kellner have challenged Borgmann's distinction between the real and hyperreal and his denigration of hyperreality as problematic.

In Real American Ethics (2006), distancing himself from both conservative and liberal ideology, Borgmann explores the role of Americans in the making of American values, and proposes new ways for ordinary citizens to improve the country, through individual and social choices and actions.

Some of Borgmann's work has also influenced Catholic theologians, who typically interpret Borgmann's work in support of the position that technology is something to be overcome and that religion (i.e. Roman Catholicism) is to be humanity's saving grace. Meanwhile, other Christian writers such as Marva Dawn have drawn on Borgmann's notion of the device paradigm to develop a critique of the church in its capitulation to commodification where worship, for example, becomes a device to attract and please.

Bibliography

Books
Philosophy of Language: Historical Foundations and Contemporary Issues (1977) 
Technology and the Character of Contemporary Life: A Philosophical Inquiry (1984) 
Crossing the Postmodern Divide (1992) 
Holding onto Reality: The Nature of Information at the Turn of the Millennium (1999) . See the introduction to the book.
Power Failure: Christianity in the Culture of Technology (2003) 
Real American Ethics: Taking Responsibility for Our Country., University of Chicago Press (2006) . See an excerpt from the book.

Essays
 "The Question of Heidegger and Technology: A Critical Review of the Literature," (with the assistance of Carl Mitcham), Philosophy Today 23 (1987): 97-194.
 Chapter by Borgmann in Buchanan, Richard and Victor Margolin, editors Discovering Design: Explorations in Design Studies. University of Chicago Press (1995) 
 Kinds of Pragmatism (Fall 2003)

See also
Device paradigm
Technology and the Character of Contemporary Life: A Philosophical Inquiry
American philosophy
List of American philosophers

References

Further reading
 Higgs, Eric et al., Technology and the Good Life University of Chicago Press, 2000. .
 Techné: Journal of the Society for Philosophy and Technology, Fall 2002. Special issue discussing ''Holding onto Reality.

External links
Brief Biography (College of Arts and Sciences, University of Montana)
An interview/dialogue with Albert Borgmann and N. Katherine Hayles on humans and machines (1999)
Albert Borgmann on Taming Technology Interview by David Wood, August 2003.
Albert Borgmann on "Cyberspace, Cosmology, and the Meaning of Life" published in Ubiquity: Volume 8, Issue 7 (February 20, 2007 - February 26, 2007).
 Interview with Albert Borgmann. Figure/Ground. April 16th, 2010

Living people
1937 births
Philosophers from Montana
Philosophers of technology
Hyperreality theorists
University of Montana faculty
Heidegger scholars